Penicillium bovifimosum is a fungus species of the genus of Penicillium which was isolated from dry cow manure in Wyoming in the United States.

See also
List of Penicillium species

References

Further reading

bovifimosum
Fungi described in 2011